Vera Barbosa (born 13 January 1989 in Vila Franca de Xira) is a Portuguese track and field athlete. She initially competed for Cape Verde, switching to represent Portugal after 2008. At the 400 metres hurdles event at the 2012 Summer Olympics, in the heats she set a new national record with 55.22 seconds.

Competition record

References

1989 births
Living people
Portuguese female hurdlers
Portuguese female sprinters
Olympic athletes of Portugal
Athletes (track and field) at the 2012 Summer Olympics
Athletes (track and field) at the 2016 Summer Olympics
World Athletics Championships athletes for Cape Verde
World Athletics Championships athletes for Portugal
People from Vila Franca de Xira
Portuguese sportspeople of Cape Verdean descent
Sportspeople from Lisbon District
Athletes (track and field) at the 2022 Mediterranean Games
Mediterranean Games competitors for Portugal
20th-century Portuguese women
21st-century Portuguese women

Portuguese people of Cape Verdean descent